Tai Kwun, or the Former Central Police Station Compound (CPS Compound) includes three declared monuments in Central, Hong Kong: the former Central Police Station, the Former Central Magistracy, and the Victoria Prison. Surrounded by Hollywood Road, Arbuthnot Road, Chancery Lane and Old Bailey Street, the compound underwent a heritage revitalisation and reopened to the public on 29 May 2018 as "Tai Kwun", a centre for heritage and arts.

History
The Former Central Police Station Compound, built between 1841 and 1925, comprises 16 historic buildings grouped under the former Central Police Station, the Former Central Magistracy and the Victoria Prison. Most of the city's historic colonial architecture had been bulldozed for development before the British government handed it back to China in 1997. 

The first building in the Former Central Police Station Compound is a Magistrate's House with jail blocks, which were built in 09Aug 1841. In the year of 1899, the Former Central Prison renamed into Victora Prison (or Victoria Gaol). The site underwent numerous expansions and reconstruction over the next century. In the year of 1862, the number of prisoners increased to 650, therefore the government decided to develop the land nearby. The series of compound hence formed 'Tai Kwun'. When Victoria Prison was decommissioned in 2006, the compound accomplished its mission as a law enforcement organization for Hong Kong. 

In December 1867, Guo Songtao, a Chinese diplomat and statesman during the Qing dynasty, passed by Hong Kong with his team while on their way to Great Britain. During their stay in Hong Kong, they made a visit to the Central Police Station, and Guo had written about the prison in his journal. In his journal, he mentioned that in Victoria Prison, a 3-storey building, a prisoner, who committed a most serious crime, would be locked at the top level of the building.

In 2008, the Hong Kong SAR Government partnered with the Hong Kong Jockey Club to conserve and revitalise the complex. 

The revitalisation project is one of the most significant and most expensive revitalisation projects in Hong Kong. It has been led by the Hong Kong Jockey Club in partnership with the Government of the Hong Kong SAR.  The HK$1.8 billion project was conceptualised in 2007 and conservation work started in 2011.  The Hong Kong Jockey Club's charities trust has spent over HK$3.7 billion so far since 2011 as of May 2018. 

The conversion was completed in phases. Work faced a setback when a wall and roof collapsed in 2016. The Buildings Department prosecuted a sub-contractor it deemed responsible for the accident, which was reportedly triggered by the failure of a brick pier that had been structurally undermined. Tai Kwun partially reopened to the public in May 2018.

Tai Kwun

A Former Central Police Station (CPS) Revitalisation Project was established to conserve and revitalise the heritage site for reuse. The project was operated by the Hong Kong Jockey Club and took eight years and HK$3.8 billion or about US$480M in 2018.

Tai Kwun, named after the historical colloquial name of the compound, is a mix of heritage and contemporary architecture. 16 heritage buildings have been restored for reuse. An additional two new buildings have been constructed, featuring designs inspired by the site's historic brickwork.

The remodelled compound was opened to the public in three phases, beginning with the inaugural exhibition "100 Faces of Tai Kwun" on 29 May 2018.

As early as the 1880s, the name Tai Kwun has been recorded in news articles in reference to the Former Central Police Station.

In 2018, Time listed Tai Kwun in its "World's Greatest Places 2018" list.

In 2019, Tai Kwun was awarded "Award of Excellence" from the UNESCO Asia-Pacific Awards for Cultural Heritage Conservation.

Gallery

Awards

In popular culture
Anson Lo's 'Burn Out' music video is filmed at The Chinese Library, Tai Kwun.

References

External links
 

Arts centres in Hong Kong
Central, Hong Kong